Pollenia margarita is a species of cluster fly in the family Polleniidae.

Distribution
P. margarita is distributed around Austria.

References

Polleniidae
Insects described in 2021
Diptera of Europe